Domhnall Ó hÚigínn (fl. 1574) was an Irish poet and teacher.

Domhnall was a member of the same clan as Tadhg Dall Ó hÚigínn (1550–1591) and the scribe of Leabhar Cloinne Aodha Buidhe (fl. 1680).

This branch of the Uí hÚigínn ran a school of poetry at Kilclooney, near Milltown, County Galway. They were a branch of the Uí hÚigínn Magheny, County Sligo. They had originally settled there at the request of Brian mac Domhnaill Ó Conchobhair Sligo (ruled 1403–1440).

The Book of the Burkes is a surviving manuscript, created by Tadhg Dall Ó hÚigínn, and Domhnall's son, Ruaidhrí Ó hÚigínn.

Domhnall himself is listed as in possession of Kilclooney castle in 1575, and there he conducted a well renowned bardic school ... possibly under the patronage of the local O'Connors ... One bardic poem of Tadhg Dall Ó hÚigínn ... informs us that Ulster students came to study at Kilclooney. Scottish students were also reputed to have attended there.

References

 Milltown Sketches, Molloy, 1995

People from County Galway
16th-century Irish writers
Irish-language poets